Jonathan Hill (born 1958) is an English architect, architectural historian, and book author/editor.

Hill joined University College London, part of the University of London, England, in 1989. He is Professor of Architecture and Visual Theory in the Bartlett School of Architecture at UCL.

Jonathan Hill has published a number of books including:

 The Illegal Architect (1998)
 Actions of Architecture (2003)
 Drawing Research (2006)
 Immaterial Architecture (Routledge, 2006)
 Weather Architecture (Routledge, 2012)
 A Landscape of Architecture, History and Fiction (Routledge, 2015)
 The Architecture of Ruins: Designs on the Past, Present and Future (Routledge, 2019 )

He is also series co-editor of the Design Research in Architecture book series published by Ashgate.

See also
 List of architectural historians
 List of University College London people

References

External links
 Jonathan Hill – UCL home page
 Jonathan Hill – Bartlett home page

1958 births
Living people
Academics of University College London
Architects from London
English architectural historians
English architecture writers
English book editors
English male non-fiction writers